The Oshkosh Striker is a specialized airport aircraft firefighting (ARFF) vehicle built by Oshkosh Corporation at the Pierce Mfg. facilities in Appleton, Wisconsin. There are three models of the Striker: 1500, 3000, 4500. All models are available with a snozzle capable of piercing an aircraft fuselage to dispense fire retardant material within a cabin or cargo area.

On April 17, 2015 Oshkosh announced they will debut a new twin engine Striker 8 X 8 at Interschutz 2015

1500 (4x4)
The Striker 1500,  Striker 4x4, is the 2 axle model. It features
 water tank
 foam tank
 of dry chemical
 of Halotron 1
Oshkosh unveiled a new modernized Striker at FDIC-Indianapolis, April 2010. It is  lighter so it is faster and more maneuverable. The new Striker was designed with extensive feedback from firefighters and fire chiefs. This new edition has  of glass in the front windscreen, and for the first time has crosslays. Engine maintenance is facilitated by a walk-in, step-up platform incorporated into the rear of the unit, making major systems easily serviced.

3000 (6x6)
The Striker 3000, a.k.a. Striker 6x6, is the 3 axle model. It features: 
 water tank
 foam tank
 of dry chemical
 of Halotron 1

4500 (8x8)
The Striker 4500, a.k.a. Striker 8x8, is the 4 axle model. It features:

 water tank
 foam tank
 of dry chemical
 of Halotron 1

References

External links 

Striker Oshkosh product page

Fire service vehicles
Oshkosh vehicles
Aircraft rescue and firefighting